Jolyn Beer (born 26 May 1994) is a German sport shooter.

She participated at the 2018 ISSF World Shooting Championships, winning a medal. She is openly lesbian.

References

External links

1994 births
Living people
German female sport shooters
ISSF rifle shooters
European Games competitors for Germany
Shooters at the 2019 European Games
Olympic shooters of Germany
Shooters at the 2020 Summer Olympics

German LGBT sportspeople
LGBT sport shooters
Lesbian sportswomen
21st-century German women